Shěn is the Mandarin Hanyu pinyin romanization of the Chinese surname .

Shen is the 14th surname in the Song-era Hundred Family Surnames.

Romanisation
沈 is romanised as Sum, Sem, Sam, or Shum in Cantonese; Sim in Hokkien; Shim in Hakka; Shim,  (심) in Korean; and Thẩm in Vietnamese.

Less commonly, the same character can also be pronounced Zhen, which indicates a different origin from Shen.

Distribution
Shen was the 52nd-most-common surname in the People's Republic of China (China) in 2020 according to the Ministry of Public Security and ranked 40th in the 100 most common surnames in the Republic of China (Taiwan) in 2018 by the Ministry of the Interior. According to China's 2013 Fuxi Cultural Research (中華伏羲文化研究會), there are approximately 5.5 million 沈's accounting for 0.41% of the Han Chinese population and placed 49th out of the 400 Chinese surnames in Mainland China. The highest concentration of 沈 is in the Eastern Chinese coastal provinces of Jiangsu and Zhejiang which represents about 36% of all 沈's in China. A remaining 37% of all 沈's in China inhabit neighboring provinces of Jiangsu and Zhejiang. As of the top 30 cities in China, top ranking last names rank 沈 as 6th most common in Hangzhou during 2011 and 8th most common in Shanghai during 2018.
 
In 2015, South Korea’s population of 沈 is less than 1% of the country’s population or 272,049 people.  In 2009, Singapore’s population of 沈 accounted for 0.9% of the city’s population  or 23,800 people. In 2006, Hangzhou's population of 沈 was 3.09% of the city's population or 202,358 people.

Although Chinese make up the largest part of America's Asian and Pacific Islander population, none of the romanizations of "沈" appeared among the 1000 most common surnames during the AD 2000 US census although "shen" ranked #3690, "shum" ranked #13,730, "shim" ranked #7576, "tham" ranked #21,829. In the 1990 US census however, "shen" ranked #10,565, "shum" ranked #22,632, "shim" ranked #9771, "tham" ranked #28,237.

Origin
As is common with Chinese surnames, the modern Shen family arose from various unrelated sources.

One origin traces it to the Shen (沈) kingdom in Runan County, Henan. These people were descended from Shao Hao, whose grandson was Zhuanxu's teacher and fathered Yun Ge and Tai Dai. Tai Dai was granted Shanxi for his achievements in controlling the flooding of the Yellow River and his descendants divided into four "kingdoms": the Shen, the Yi, the Ru, and the Huang. Electing not to participate in the northern kingdoms' campaign against Chu in 506 BC, Shen was invaded and destroyed by Cai. The rulers and vassals of the former state then bore the clan name Shen to distinguish themselves.

Another group descended from the rulers and vassals of the revived state of Shen after King Cheng granted it to the Zhou prince Ran Ji for suppressing the rebellion following the death of his brother King Wu.

A third group derived from the Mi family of Chu during the Spring and Autumn period. Chu had conquered the area of Shen and, in 506 BC, its governor was Shenyin Shua Chu field marshal from a cadet branch of the royal house. He was killed in the Battle of Boju that year, opposing a Wu invasion led by Wu Zixu and Sun Tzu. In his memory, some of his descendants and vassals adopted the clan name Shen for his fief, while others became the Ye after the fief granted to Shenyin Shu's son Shen Zhuliang, better known as the Duke of Ye (葉公, Ye Gong).

Branches
The You clan is said to be a branch of the Shen clan, having simply removed the side-water radical 氵 from their surname sometime in the 10th century due to conflict with a different Shen ruling family in Fujian Province. Owing to this, the You and Shen continued to be unable to intermarry, just as if they were still a single clan.

The side-water radical (: shuǐ) plus (: yín) results in the Chinese character surname (: shěn).

References

External links

Chinese-language surnames
Individual Chinese surnames